James Fullwood (17 February 1911 – 1981) was a professional footballer who played for Thorne Colliery, Tottenham Hotspur, and Reading.

Football career 
The left back began his career at Thorne Colliery. Fullwood joined Tottenham Hotspur in 1934 and played a total of 35 matches and scoring once in all competitions for the Lilywhites. After leaving White Hart Lane, Fullwood joined Reading where he went on to feature in a further 44 matches between 1938–39.

References

1911 births
1981 deaths
English footballers
People from Ilkeston
Footballers from Derbyshire
Thorne Colliery F.C. players
English Football League players
Tottenham Hotspur F.C. players
Reading F.C. players
Brentford F.C. wartime guest players
Association football fullbacks